This is a list of Latvian football transfers in the 2014–15 winter transfer window by club. Only transfers of the Virslīga are included.

All transfers mentioned are shown in the references at the bottom of the page. If you wish to insert a transfer that isn't mentioned there, please add a reference.

Latvian Higher League

Ventspils 

In:

 

Out:

Skonto 

In:

Out:

Jelgava 

In:

Out:

Liepāja 

In:

 

Out:

Daugava Daugavpils (Debarred from participation) 

In:

Out:

Spartaks 

In:

Out:

Daugava Rīga (Debarred from participation) 

In:

Out:

BFC Daugavpils 

In:

 

 

Out:

METTA/LU 

In:

Out:

Gulbene 

In:

 

  

Out:

References

External links 
 sportacentrs.com 

2014-15
Latvia
Football
tansfers
tansfers